Heringomyia fordianum is a species of tephritid or fruit flies in the genus Heringomyia of the family Tephritidae.

Distribution
Rwanda, Zimbabwe.

References

Tephritinae
Insects described in 1935
Diptera of Africa